Raman Makarau is a Belarusian paralympic swimmer. He won the silver medal in the Men's 50 metre freestyle - S12 event at the 2004 Summer Paralympics in Athens.

References

Paralympic swimmers of Belarus
Swimmers at the 2004 Summer Paralympics
Paralympic silver medalists for Belarus
Belarusian male freestyle swimmers
Living people
Medalists at the 2004 Summer Paralympics
Medalists at the 2008 Summer Paralympics
Swimmers at the 2008 Summer Paralympics
S12-classified Paralympic swimmers
Paralympic gold medalists for Belarus
Year of birth missing (living people)
Paralympic medalists in swimming